The 2014–15 Georgia Tech Yellow Jackets women's basketball team will represent Georgia Institute of Technology during the 2014–15 NCAA Division I women's basketball season. Returning as head coach was MaChelle Joseph entering her 12th season. The team plays its home games at the McCamish Pavilion in Atlanta, Georgia as members of the Atlantic Coast Conference. They finished the season 19–15, 7–9 in ACC play to finish in a three way tie for ninth place. They advanced to the second round of the ACC women's tournament where they lost to North Carolina. They were invited to the Women's National Invitation Tournament which they defeated Elon before losing to Ole Miss in the second round.

2014–15 media
All Yellow Jackets games will air on the Yellow Jackets IMG Sports Network. WREK once again serves as the home of the Ramblin Wreck women's basketball team.

2014–15 Roster

Schedule

|-
!colspan=9 style=""| Exhibition

|-
!colspan=9 style=""| Regular Season

|-
!colspan=9 style="" | 2015 ACC Tournament

|-
!colspan=9 style="" | WNIT

Source

Rankings
2014–15 NCAA Division I women's basketball rankings

References

Georgia Tech
Georgia Tech Yellow Jackets women's basketball seasons